Guwa (Goa) is an extinct and nearly unattested Australian Aboriginal language of Queensland spoken by the Koa people. It was apparently close to Yanda.

References

Maric languages
Extinct languages of Queensland